The Bunderspitz is a mountain of the Bernese Alps, located between Adelboden and Kandersteg in the canton of Bern.

The summit can be reached by a trail from both sides.

References

External links
 Bunderspitz on Hikr

Mountains of the Alps
Mountains of Switzerland
Mountains of the canton of Bern
Two-thousanders of Switzerland